Angelo Tantsis (born 3 January 1958) is a former Australian rules footballer who played for the Footscray Football Club in the Victorian Football League (VFL).

Notes

External links 
		

Living people
1958 births
Australian rules footballers from Victoria (Australia)
Western Bulldogs players